Viniferal is a hydroxystilbenoid with an aldehyde group found in Vitis vinifera (grapevine).

References

External links 
 Website of the Schröder group

Oligostilbenoids
Aldehydes
Grape